Broseley is an unincorporated community in eastern Butler County, Missouri, United States. It is located on Missouri Route 51, approximately ten miles southeast of Poplar Bluff. Nyssa is two miles to the south and Batesville is two miles to the north.

The community was founded in 1915 by William N. Barron and is named after his wife's hometown of Broseley in England.

Twin Rivers R-X School District serves the community and operates Twin Rivers High School in Broseley.

Demographics

References

Unincorporated communities in Butler County, Missouri
Unincorporated communities in Missouri